

Schilder is mainly a Dutch surname, meaning "painter". Notable people with the surname include:

Anny Schilder (born 1959), Dutch singer
Cornelius Schilder (born 1941), Dutch bishop
Franz Alfred Schilder (1896–1970), Austrian-German zoologist
Henny Schilder (born 1984), Dutch football player
Herbert Schilder (1928-2006), American dental surgeon
Hilton Schilder (born 1959), South African musician
Klaas Schilder (1890-1952), Dutch theologian
Maria Schilder (1898–1975), German zoologist
Mike Schilder (born 1994), Dutch basketball player
Nick Schilder (born 1983), Dutch singer-songwriter
Paul Ferdinand Schilder (1886–1940), Austrian neurologist, psychiatrist and psychoanalyst
Robbert Schilder (born 1986), Dutch footballer
Simone Schilder (born 1967), Dutch tennis player

See also
Nikolay Shilder, Russian (Baltic German) painter
Louis Schilders, a Belgian engineer and businessman
Schilder's disease (disambiguation)
Schilder's theorem
Schilde
Schildt

References 

Dutch-language surnames
German-language surnames
Occupational surnames